The Lancaster Commercial Historic District is a registered historic district located in Lancaster, Kentucky that was added to the United States National Register of Historic Places in 1984.

It includes the Garrard County Courthouse, built in 1868, which was the third-built courthouse of the area.

The district was deemed notable as containing "Lancaster's best contiguous collection of buildings illustrating Lancaster's commercial and architectural development. In a six block area there are Federal log and brick structures, Gothic Revival church, Italianate cast iron store fronts, Queen Anne bay windows, and symmetrical Classical Revival detailing."

References

National Register of Historic Places in Garrard County, Kentucky
Historic districts on the National Register of Historic Places in Kentucky
Lancaster, Kentucky
Commercial buildings on the National Register of Historic Places in Kentucky